In mathematics, and more specifically in linear algebra, a linear map (also called a linear mapping, linear transformation, vector space homomorphism, or in some contexts linear function) is a mapping  between two  vector spaces that preserves the operations of vector addition and scalar multiplication. The same names and the same definition are also used for the more general case of modules over a ring; see Module homomorphism.

In the case where , a linear map is called a linear endomorphism. Sometimes the term linear function has the same meaning as linear map, while in analysis it does not.

A linear map from V  to W always maps the origin of V  to the origin of W. Moreover, it maps  linear subspaces in V onto linear subspaces in W (possibly of a lower dimension); for example, it maps a plane through the origin in V to either a plane through the origin in W, a line through the origin in W, or just the origin in W. Linear maps can often be represented as matrices, and simple examples include rotation and reflection linear transformations.

In the language of category theory, linear maps are the morphisms of vector spaces.

Definition and first consequences

Let  and  be vector spaces over the same field . 
A function  is said to be a linear map if for any two vectors  and any scalar  the following two conditions are satisfied:

 Additivity / operation of addition 
 Homogeneity of degree 1 / operation of scalar multiplication 

Thus, a linear map is said to be operation preserving. In other words, it does not matter whether the linear map is applied before (the right hand sides of the above examples) or after (the left hand sides of the examples) the operations of addition and scalar multiplication.

By the associativity of the addition operation denoted as +, for any vectors  and scalars  the following equality holds:
  Thus a linear map is one which preserves linear combinations.

A linear map  with  viewed as a one-dimensional vector space over itself is called a linear functional.

These statements generalize to any left-module  over a ring  without modification, and to any right-module upon reversing of the scalar multiplication.

Examples

 A prototypical example that gives linear maps their name is a function , of which the graph is a line through the origin.
 More generally, any homothety   where  centered in the origin of a vector space is a linear map.  
 The zero map  between two vector spaces (over the same field) is linear.
 The identity map on any module is a linear operator.
 For real numbers, the map  is not linear.
 For real numbers, the map  is not linear (but is an affine transformation).
 If  is an isometry between real normed spaces such that  then  is a linear map. This result is not necessarily true for complex normed space. 
 Differentiation defines a linear map from the space of all differentiable functions to the space of all functions. It also defines a linear operator on the space of all smooth functions (a linear operator is a linear endomorphism, that is, a linear map with the same domain and codomain). An example is 
For example, 
Without a fixed starting point, the antiderivative maps to the quotient space of the differentiable functions by the linear space of constant functions. 

Linear extensions

Often, a linear map is constructed by defining it on a subset of a vector space and then  to the linear span of the domain. 
In particular, if  has a linear extension to  then it has a linear extension to all of  

If a linear extension of  exists then the linear extension  is unique and

If  is linearly independent then every function  into any vector space has a linear extension to a (linear) map  (the converse is also true). 

For example, if  and  then the assignment  and  can be linearly extended from the linearly independent set of vectors  to a linear map on  The unique linear extension  is the map that sends  to

Every (scalar-valued) linear functional  defined on a vector subspace of a real or complex vector space  has a linear extension to all of  
Indeed, the Hahn–Banach dominated extension theorem even guarantees that when this linear functional  is dominated by some given seminorm  (meaning that  holds for all  in the domain of ) then there exists a linear extension to  that is also dominated by

Matrices

This is useful because it allows concrete calculations. Matrices yield examples of linear maps: if  is a real  matrix, then  describes a linear map  (see Euclidean space).

Then every vector  is uniquely determined by the coefficients  in the field :

If  is a linear map,

which implies that the function f is entirely determined by the vectors . Then we can represent each vector  as

To define it more clearly, for some column  that corresponds to the mapping ,

In other words, every column  has a corresponding vector  whose coordinates  are the elements of column . A single linear map may be represented by many matrices. This is because the values of the elements of a matrix depend on the bases chosen.

The matrices of a linear transformation can be represented visually:

 Matrix for  relative to : 
 Matrix for  relative to : 

Such that starting in the bottom left corner  and looking for the bottom right corner , one would left-multiply—that is, .

Examples in two dimensions
In two-dimensional space R2 linear maps are described by 2 × 2 matrices. These are some examples:

 rotation
 by 90 degrees counterclockwise: 
 by an angle θ counterclockwise: 
 reflection
 through the x axis: 
 through the y axis: 
 through a line making an angle θ with the origin:  
 scaling by 2 in all directions: 
 horizontal shear mapping: 
 squeeze mapping: 
 projection onto the y axis:

Vector space of linear maps

It follows from this that the class of all vector spaces over a given field K, together with K-linear maps as morphisms, forms a category.

The inverse of a linear map, when defined, is again a linear map.

Furthermore, in the case that , this vector space, denoted , is an associative algebra under composition of maps, since the composition of two linear maps  is again a linear map, and the composition of maps is always associative. This case is discussed in more detail below.

Given again the finite-dimensional case, if bases have been chosen, then the composition of linear maps corresponds to the matrix multiplication, the addition of linear maps corresponds to the matrix addition, and the multiplication of linear maps with scalars corresponds to the multiplication of matrices with scalars.

Endomorphisms and automorphisms

The multiplicative identity element of this algebra is the identity map .

Since the automorphisms are precisely those endomorphisms which possess inverses under composition,  is the group of units in the ring .

Kernel, image and the rank–nullity theorem

The following dimension formula is known as the rank–nullity theorem:

Cokernel

A subtler invariant of a linear transformation  is the cokernel, which is defined as

This is the dual notion to the kernel: just as the kernel is a subspace of the domain, the co-kernel is a quotient space of the target. Formally, one has the exact sequence

These can be interpreted thus: given a linear equation f(v) = w to solve,

 the kernel is the space of solutions to the homogeneous equation f(v) = 0, and its dimension is the number of degrees of freedom in the space of solutions, if it is not empty;
 the co-kernel is the space of constraints that the solutions must satisfy, and its dimension is the maximal number of independent constraints.

The dimension of the co-kernel and the dimension of the image (the rank) add up to the dimension of the target space. For finite dimensions, this means that the dimension of the quotient space W/f(V) is the dimension of the target space minus the dimension of the image.

As a simple example, consider the map f: R2 → R2, given by f(x, y) = (0, y). Then for an equation f(x, y) = (a, b) to have a solution, we must have a = 0 (one constraint), and in that case the solution space is (x, b) or equivalently stated, (0, b) + (x, 0), (one degree of freedom). The kernel may be expressed as the subspace (x, 0) < V: the value of x is the freedom in a solution – while the cokernel may be expressed via the map W → R, : given a vector (a, b), the value of a is the obstruction to there being a solution.

An example illustrating the infinite-dimensional case is afforded by the map f: R∞ → R∞,  with b1 = 0 and bn + 1 = an for n > 0. Its image consists of all sequences with first element 0, and thus its cokernel consists of the classes of sequences with identical first element. Thus, whereas its kernel has dimension 0 (it maps only the zero sequence to the zero sequence), its co-kernel has dimension 1. Since the domain and the target space are the same, the rank and the dimension of the kernel add up to the same sum as the rank and the dimension of the co-kernel, but in the infinite-dimensional case it cannot be inferred that the kernel and the co-kernel of an endomorphism have the same dimension (0 ≠ 1). The reverse situation obtains for the map h: R∞ → R∞,  with cn = an + 1. Its image is the entire target space, and hence its co-kernel has dimension 0, but since it maps all sequences in which only the first element is non-zero to the zero sequence, its kernel has dimension 1.

Index
For a linear operator with finite-dimensional kernel and co-kernel, one may define index as:

namely the degrees of freedom minus the number of constraints.

For a transformation between finite-dimensional vector spaces, this is just the difference dim(V) − dim(W), by rank–nullity. This gives an indication of how many solutions or how many constraints one has: if mapping from a larger space to a smaller one, the map may be onto, and thus will have degrees of freedom even without constraints. Conversely, if mapping from a smaller space to a larger one, the map cannot be onto, and thus one will have constraints even without degrees of freedom.

The index of an operator is precisely the Euler characteristic of the 2-term complex 0 → V → W → 0. In operator theory, the index of Fredholm operators is an object of study, with a major result being the Atiyah–Singer index theorem.

Algebraic classifications of linear transformations

No classification of linear maps could be exhaustive. The following incomplete list enumerates some important classifications that do not require any additional structure on the vector space.

Let  and  denote vector spaces over a field  and let  be a linear map.

Monomorphism
 is said to be injective or a monomorphism if any of the following equivalent conditions are true:
  is one-to-one as a map of sets.
 
 

Epimorphism
 is said to be surjective or an epimorphism if any of the following equivalent conditions are true:
  is onto as a map of sets.
 

Isomorphism
 is said to be an isomorphism if it is both left- and right-invertible. This is equivalent to  being both one-to-one and onto (a bijection of sets) or also to  being both epic and monic, and so being a bimorphism.

If  is an endomorphism, then:
 If , then  is said to be idempotent
 If , where  is some scalar, then  is said to be a scaling transformation or scalar multiplication map; see scalar matrix.

Change of basis

Given a linear map which is an endomorphism whose matrix is A, in the basis B of the space it transforms vector coordinates [u] as [v] = A[u]. As vectors change with the inverse of B (vectors are contravariant) its inverse transformation is [v] = B[v'].

Substituting this in the first expression

hence

Therefore, the matrix in the new basis is A′ = B−1AB, being B the matrix of the given basis.

Therefore, linear maps are said to be 1-co- 1-contra-variant objects, or type (1, 1) tensors.

Continuity

A linear transformation between topological vector spaces, for example normed spaces, may be continuous. If its domain and codomain are the same, it will then be a continuous linear operator. A linear operator on a normed linear space is continuous if and only if it is bounded, for example, when the domain is finite-dimensional. An infinite-dimensional domain may have discontinuous linear operators.

An example of an unbounded, hence discontinuous, linear transformation is differentiation on the space of smooth functions equipped with the supremum norm (a function with small values can have a derivative with large values, while the derivative of 0 is 0). For a specific example,  converges to 0, but its derivative  does not, so differentiation is not continuous at 0 (and by a variation of this argument, it is not continuous anywhere).

Applications
A specific application of linear maps is for geometric transformations, such as those performed in computer graphics, where the translation, rotation and scaling of 2D or 3D objects is performed by the use of a transformation matrix. Linear mappings also are used as a mechanism for describing change: for example in calculus correspond to derivatives; or in relativity, used as a device to keep track of the local transformations of reference frames.

Another application of these transformations is in compiler optimizations of nested-loop code, and in parallelizing compiler techniques.

See also

Notes

Bibliography

 

 
 

  
 
  

  
  
  
  
 
  

Abstract algebra
Functions and mappings
 
Transformation (function)